Eridachtha parvella is a moth in the family Lecithoceridae. It was described by Pierre Chrétien in 1915. It is found in Algeria.

The wingspan is about 9 mm. The forewings are white. The hindwings are white, somewhat bronzy along the external margin.

References

Moths described in 1915
Eridachtha